Tuhala Witch's Well is a karst spring in Kose Parish, Harju County, Estonia that overflows after heavy rains.

In Estonian folklore, it is said to be caused by witches lashing each other underground. In 2012 the Tuhala Witch's Well was voted as a "Wonder of Estonia".

References

Further reading
Loodusmälestised 22. Harjumaa-Raplamaa, Kohila karstivaldkond. Kose, Kohila. Compiled by Hella Kink. Edited by Anto Raukas. Teaduste Akadeemia Kirjastus. Tallinn 2011.
Marju Kõivupuu. 101 Eesti pühapaika. Tallinn: Varrak 2011, pp 190–193.
Ants Talioja. Tuhala radadel. OÜ Kadmirell. Tallinn 2012.
Gustav Vilbaste. Loodusvaatleja nr 4/5 september 1936. Special number of Kose.

External links 
Entry in visitestonia.com
360º virtual tour

Geography of Estonia
Kose Parish